Penicillium hoeksii is a species of the genus of Penicillium.

References

hoeksii
Fungi described in 2014